The WGC-HSBC Champions was a professional golf tournament, held annually in China. Inaugurated in 2005, the first seven editions were played at the Sheshan Golf Club in Shanghai, then moved to the Mission Hills Golf Club in Shenzhen for a single year in 2012. It returned to Sheshan Golf Club in 2013.

Since 2009, it was a World Golf Championship event. Played in November, it was the fourth tournament on the WGC calendar along with the WGC-Dell Match Play, the WGC-Mexico Championship, and the WGC-FedEx St. Jude Invitational events, all in North America. The field consists primarily of players who have won the top rated tournaments since the previous WGC-HSBC tournament, supplemented by other leading players in the world rankings and money lists of the major tours.

The WGC-HSBC Champions had the highest prize money in East Asia. Originally in 2005, it was US$5 million, and grew to $7 million when it obtained WGC status in 2009, $8.5 million in 2013 and in 2019, the prize money was $10.25 million. Only the CIMB Classic, CJ Cup, Zozo Championship and BMW Masters have had similar purses in the region.

Field

2005–2008
Originally, the event was sanctioned by four —the European, the Asian, and Sunshine Tours and the PGA Tour of Australasia— of the six constituent tours of International Federation of PGA Tours at that time. Invitations were issued to all players placed amongst the top 50 in the Official World Golf Ranking (OWGR). Also invited were players who had, during the calendar year preceding the event, captured at least one tournament title on a sanctioning tour, or had finished the preceding season amongst the top twenty in the European Tour's Race to Dubai (the Order of Merit standings through 2008) or amongst the top five in the Order of Merit standings of any of the other three sanctioning tours. Players who had finished first in the Order of Merit standings in any of three developmental tours—the Von Nida and Challenge Tours and the winter swing of the Sunshine Tour—were also invited. Finally, starting berths were also reserved for eight Chinese amateur and professional players to be selected by tournament organizers and sponsors, whether by qualifying tournament or not.

2009: Elevated to WGC status
The event became a World Golf Championship in 2009 on the European Tour. The field consists primarily of winners of the most important tournaments around the world since the previous WGC-HSBC Champions tournament. Each of the six member tours are allocated a certain number of tournaments from their tour (from 4 to 20), although these tournament must meet a minimum entry requirement. Co-sanctioned tournaments are assigned to one tour only.

The tournaments are ranked using the Official World Golf Ranking strength of field ("total event ranking"). Tournaments must have a minimum event ranking of 40. The ranking is based on the previous year's event ranking so that the list of qualifying events can be determined in advance. New events can be included if they are expected to have an event ranking of at least 40.

Further players gain entry through their position in the current seasons Order of Merit. Six players from China are selected while any player ranked in the world top 50 is also given an entry. If the field size is less than 78, further entries are selected from winners of additional tournaments not already considered, players ranked outside the world top 50, and the players further down the Order of Merit lists.

The tournament was the second event of the European Tour Final Series from 2013 to 2015.

Current qualifications
The current qualification categories are as follows:

Winners of the four major championships and The Players Championship
Winners of the four World Golf Championships
Top 50 in the Official World Golf Ranking as of two weeks prior the start of the event
Top 30 available players from the final FedEx Cup Points List (if less than 5 players are available, players from position 31 or lower will be selected to fill in)
Top 30 available players from the Race to Dubai Ranking as of one week prior the start of the event
Top 4 available players from the Asian Tour ad hoc qualifying ranking
Top 2 available players from the Japan Golf Tour Order of Merit as of one week prior the start of the event
Top 2 available players from the final PGA Tour of Australasia Order of Merit
Top 2 available players from the final Sunshine Tour Order of Merit
Six players from China
Alternates

PGA Tour status
From 2009 to 2012 the WGC-HSBC Champions was an unofficial money event on the PGA Tour, meaning that prize money did not count towards the PGA Tour money list or Fed-Ex Cup points standings.  Since 2010, victories have counted as official wins for PGA Tour members, and as such Phil Mickelson's victory in 2009 is not counted as an official win. During this time only Ian Poulter (2012) was a PGA Tour member at the time of his win; Martin Kaymer (2011) and Francesco Molinari (2010) did not join the tour until 2013 and 2014 respectively.

Since 2013, the WGC-HSBC Champions has been an official PGA Tour event, with the winner receiving a three-year exemption on the tour.

Winners

Notes

References

External links
Official site
Coverage on Asian Tour's official site
Coverage on European Tour's official site
Coverage on PGA Tour's official site

 
World Golf Championships
Former Asian Tour events
Former PGA Tour of Australasia events
Former Sunshine Tour events
Former European Tour events
Former PGA Tour events
Golf tournaments in China
Sports competitions in Shanghai
Recurring sporting events established in 2005
HSBC
2005 establishments in China